Deep temporal can refer to:
 Deep temporal nerves
 Deep temporal arteries